The white-naped yuhina (Yuhina bakeri) is a bird species in the white-eye family Zosteropidae.

It is found from the Himalayas to northern Myanmar. Its natural habitats are temperate forests and subtropical or tropical moist lowland forests.

References

Collar, N. J. & Robson, C. 2007. Family Timaliidae (Babblers)  pp. 70 – 291 in; del Hoyo, J., Elliott, A. & Christie, D.A. eds. Handbook of the Birds of the World, Vol. 12. Picathartes to Tits and Chickadees. Lynx Edicions, Barcelona.

white-naped yuhina
Birds of Eastern Himalaya
Birds of Myanmar
white-naped yuhina
Taxonomy articles created by Polbot